In macroeconomics, Friedman's k-percent rule (named for Milton Friedman) is the monetarist proposal that the money supply should be increased by the central bank by a constant percentage rate every year, irrespective of business cycles.

Definition
According to Milton Friedman "The stock of money [should be] increased at a fixed rate year-in and year-out without any variation in the rate of increase to meet cyclical needs." (Friedman 1960)  Giving governments any flexibility in setting money growth will lead to inflation according to Friedman. The main policy to be avoided is countercyclical monetary policy, the standard Keynesian policy recommendation at the time.  For this reason, the central bank should be forced to expand the money supply at a constant rate, equivalent to the rate of growth of real GDP. 

This is not to be confused with the Friedman Rule, which is a policy of zero nominal interest rates.

See also
 Taylor rule
 Inflation targeting
 Inverted yield curve
 McCallum rule
 NDGP Targeting

References

 Friedman's Money Supply Rule vs. Optimal Interest Rate Policy
 Model Uncertainty and Delegation: A Case for Friedman's k-percent Money Growth Rule
 A K-Percent Rule for Monetary Policy in West Germany
 Rules, discretion and reputation in a model of monetary policy, Robert J. Barro, David B. Gordon
 Discretion versus policy rules in practice, John B. Taylor

Further reading
 Milton Friedman (1960), A Program for Monetary Stability (New York: Fordham University Press).

Milton Friedman
Monetary policy
Monetary economics